The term "blood curse" refers to a New Testament passage from the Gospel of Matthew, which describes events taking place in Pilate's court before the crucifixion of Jesus and specifically the apparent willingness of the Jewish crowd to accept liability for Jesus' death.

Biblical narrative
 reads:

Interpretation
This passage has no counterpart in the other Gospels and is probably related to the destruction of Jerusalem in the year 70 CE. German Protestant theologian Ulrich Luz (b. 1938) describes it as "redactional fiction" invented by the author of the Matthew Gospel. Some writers, viewing it as part of Matthew's anti-Jewish polemic, see in it the seeds of later Christian antisemitism. In the view of the late Graham Stanton, a British New Testament scholar in the Reformed tradition, "Matthew's anti-Jewish polemic should be seen as part of the self-definition of the Christian minority which is acutely aware of the rejection and hostility of its 'mother' Judaism."
 Howard Clark Kee has written, "The bitter words he [Matthew] attributes to the Jews have caused endless harm in arrousing anti-Jewish emotions." Donald A. Hagner, a Presbyterian New Testament scholar and theologian, has written, "It cannot be denied that this statement, unfortunately, has been used to promote anti-Semitism. The statement is formulaic, and the reference to 'our children' does not make them guilty of the death of Jesus, let alone children or Jews of later generations."

Anglican views
N. T. Wright, an Anglican New Testament scholar and theologian, has stated, "The tragic and horrible later use of Matthew 27.25 ('his blood be on us, and on our children') as an excuse for soi-disant 'Christian' anti-semitism is a gross distortion of its original meaning, where the reference is surely to the fall of Jerusalem."

Anglican theologian Rowan Williams, then Archbishop of Wales, and who would soon become Archbishop of Canterbury, has written of Matthew's Gospel being made "the tool of the most corrupt and murderous misreading of the passion stories that has disfigured the Church's record".

Catholic views
In the Roman Catechism which was produced by the Council of Trent in the mid-16th century, the Catholic Church taught the belief that the collectivity of sinful humanity was responsible for the death of Jesus, not only the Jews. In the Second Vatican Council (1962–1965), the Catholic Church under Pope Paul VI issued the declaration Nostra aetate that repudiated the idea of a collective, multigenerational Jewish guilt for the crucifixion of Jesus. It declared that the accusation could not be made "against all the Jews, without distinction, then alive, nor against the Jews of today".

Pope Benedict XVI in his 2011 book Jesus of Nazareth: Holy Week wrote:

Chrysostom
St. John Chrysostom delivered a series of eight homilies to his Antioch congregation directed at members who continued to observe Jewish feasts and fasts. Critical of this, he cast Judaism and the synagogues in his city in a critical and negative light. His homilies were expressed in the conventional polemical form.

As quoted by St. Thomas Aquinas in his Catena Aurea (1263), Chrysostom said:

See also
 Antisemitism and the New Testament
 Jewish deicide
 Sanhedrin trial of Jesus

References

Curses
Christian terminology
Crucifixion of Jesus
Gospel of Matthew
Judaism in the New Testament
Pontius Pilate
Christianity and antisemitism